"Wind Me Up (Let Me Go)" is a song by Cliff Richard, released as a single in October 1965. It peaked at number 2 on the UK Singles Chart and received a silver disc for 250,000 sales.

Recording and release
"Wind Me Up (Let Me Go)" was recorded in Nashville, Tennessee, during Richard's visit there in August 1964. It was recorded without the Shadows, instead featuring session musicians and backing vocals by the Jordinaires. The B-side,  "The Night”, was credited with the Shadows and was recorded at Abbey Road Studios, then known as EMI, in October 1965. Both tracks were included on the EP Wind Me Up.

Track listing
7": Columbia / DB 7660
 "Wind Me Up (Let Me Go)" – 2:27
 "The Night" – 3:24

7": Columbia / C 23 103 (Germany)
 "Nur bei dir bin ich zu Haus" – 2:42
 "Glaub nur mir" – 2:42

Charts

"Nur bei dir bin ich zu Haus"

References

1965 singles
1965 songs
Cliff Richard songs
Songs written by Bob Montgomery (songwriter)
Columbia Graphophone Company singles
Song recordings produced by Billy Sherrill